The Lojing Autonomous Sub-District (Malay: Jajahan Kecil Lojing,  Jawi: ججاهن كچيل لوجيڠ), or colloquially known as the Lojing Highlands,  is a mountainous region in Gua Musang District, Kelantan, Malaysia. It is located next to the famed Cameron Highlands in Pahang, along the Second East-West Highway Federal Route 185.

Administration

In 2010 Lojing was made an autonomous sub-district (Jajahan Kecil Lojing). Several state and federal agencies will open their branches there following the arrangement; municipal works remain under the responsibility of Gua Musang. It is divided into seven communes:

Balar
Blau
Hau
Hendrop
Kuala Betis
Sigar
Tuel

Geography and demographics

Perched up high in the Titiwangsa Mountains, Lojing Highlands is rich in flora and fauna and is famed for its biodiversity. Its well preserved pristine hills and jungles are popular eco-tourist attraction. There are many species of high-quality tropical hardwood such as teak, mahogany, chengal and meranti located in the jungles of the Lojing Highlands. Lojing is home to the 2,181-metre-tall Yong Belar, the tallest mountain in Kelantan and third tallest in Peninsular Malaysia.

Most of the people that live in the Lojing area belong to the indigenous Orang Asli tribes, mainly the Temiar tribe of the Senoi nations.

References

Gua Musang District
Villages in Kelantan